Drive is a 1997 action film starring Mark Dacascos, Kadeem Hardison, Tracey Walter, John Pyper-Ferguson, Brittany Murphy, and Masaya Kato. The film was directed by Steve Wang with stunt work and fight choreography done by Koichi Sakamoto. The film was released straight-to-video.

Plot
Toby Wong, a special agent from Hong Kong, has had an advanced bio-device installed in his chest, giving him superhuman speed and agility. Because he does not want China to have the device after Hong Kong reverts to Chinese control, he flees to San Francisco with Chinese forces in hot pursuit. Toby plans to sell the device to a company in Los Angeles for $5 million. The forces in pursuit are led by hillbilly assassin Vic Madison. Because Toby has the device in his chest, the mercenaries are ordered to take him alive, meaning they cannot simply shoot him in the torso/kill him, giving him an added advantage in fights.

While being chased, Toby enters a bar where he meets a down-on-his-luck, gregarious songwriter named Malik Brody. After Toby dispatches his pursuers, wrecking the bar, the police arrive. They believe Toby is a criminal and try to apprehend him. To escape, Toby takes Malik hostage. Once they are in Malik's car, Toby assures him that he means Malik no harm, and asks him for a lift to Los Angeles. Malik is initially incredulous and refuses, but the two are still being chased by Madison and his men (Toby's device emits a tracking signal they can follow). After a variety of adventures, including being handcuffed together by Madison and escaping a bus station ambush, the two form a friendship and Malik agrees to bring Toby to Los Angeles.

The pair stop at a motel and meet wild child Deliverance Bodine, who is instantly enamored with Malik. Madison and his men assault the motel and try to capture Toby using shock sticks. Toby beats them up, while Malik and Deliverance get into a gun fight with more mercenaries in the garage. Deliverance proves to be both crazy and extremely effective with guns. Ultimately Madison becomes so frustrated at his team's failures that he blows up the motel with a triple rocket launcher, but Toby, Malik and Deliverance escape. Toby and Malik leave Deliverance at a diner and continue on, stopping at a karaoke bar.

The chairman of the company that installed the device in Toby, Mr. Lau, has been bankrolling the pursuit of Toby. Mr. Lau's team replicates and improves the device that was installed in Toby, and they implant this new version in another man, the "Advanced Model." Mr. Lau orders the Advanced Model to take control of the hunt for Toby and to kill him, since they no longer need Toby's older model of the device. Madison chafes at having to take orders from the Advanced Model, but ultimately acquiesces.

Toby and Malik have a climactic showdown with the Advanced Model, Madison, and the mercenaries in the karaoke bar. After a long battle, Toby destroys the Advanced Model. Malik, meanwhile, manages to kill Madison. The two depart for Los Angeles to deliver the device to the US buyer, with Toby now planning to split the money with Malik.

Alternate cut
The US DVD, VHS and cable showings of this cult film are the "Robbie Little Cut", in which a producer on the film edited 20 minutes out of it, leaving a 98-minute running time, and replacing the original soundtrack with a techno-based score. The UK PAL "Special Edition" DVD formatted for NTSC includes not only a video transfer but a full restoration of Steve Wang's original cut, including a Dolby Digital 5.1 remix of the original soundtrack. The British DVD release is a special Director's Cut version, containing reinstated cut scenes and the original film score.  Special extras on the DVD include newly commissioned interviews with cast and crew, director's audio track, and a feature on the Japanese stunt team responsible for the film's action scenes.

Deleted scenes include:

 A scene in Malik's house where Malik and Toby enter his daughters' room and they talk about his four-year-old daughter and how much he loves her.
 A scene in which Hedgehog and Madison question the existence of aliens.
  A scene after the motel fight where Deliverance hugs Toby and Malik gets a bit jealous.
 A scene in which Toby reveals he has a brother and that they were both singers once.
 A longer version of the final fight in which Toby delivers a new kick.

Cast
 Mark Dacascos as Toby Wong, a kung-fu fighter working for the Red Chinese.
 Kadeem Hardison as Malik Brody, an extroverted songwriter.
 John Pyper-Ferguson as Vic Madison, an assassin.
 Brittany Murphy as Deliverance Bodine, a lady who runs a motel. She has a crush on Malik.
 Tracey Walter as "Hedgehog", Vic's inane henchman.
 James Shigeta as Mr. Lau
 Masaya Kato as Advanced Model
 Dom Magwili as Mr. Chow
 Ron Yuan as Razor Scarred
 Clive Rosengren as Cantwell
 Christopher Michael as Jeb
 Ted Smith as Joss
 Sanaa Lathan as Carolyn Brody
 R. A. Mihailoff as Singing Trucker

External links

 
Greatest Movie EVER! Podcast - Review
Kung Fu Cinema - Review
Kung Fu Cinema - Director Steve Wang Interview 
Micro-Shock Cinema - Screenwriter Scott Phillips Interview
Exhilarated Despair Productions - Screenwriter Scott Phillips Message Board
Studio-Nibble - Fan Site

1997 direct-to-video films
1997 films
1997 action films
American action films
Action films about Asian Americans
Films about automobiles
1990s English-language films
1990s American films